This is the episode list of the 2000s anime series. For the 1980s series, see List of Space Cobra episodes.
The original video animation (OVA) and anime series Cobra the Animation is based on the Cobra manga series written by Buichi Terasawa. All series were produced by Guild Project and animated by Magic Bus. The first OVA, was directed by Buichi Terasawa, while  was directed by Kenichi Maejima. The anime, was directed by Keizō Shimizu.

Both OVAs were released direct-to-DVD by Happinet: The Psychogun was released between August 29, 2008 and February 27, 2009, while Time Drive was released between April 24, 2009 and June 26, 2009. Rokunin no Yūshi was broadcast by BS 11 between January 2, 2010 and March 27, 2010. The OVA were later released in a DVD box set on February 19, 2010 by Happinet. The anime series episodes were later released in seven DVD and Blu-ray compilations between April 23, 2010 and October 2, 2010 by Happinet.

On December 18, 2009, Crunchyroll and Happinet announced that Crunchyroll would begin to stream the first OVA series on that day. The last episode was streamed on January 8, 2010. The two episodes of Time Drive were uploaded on January 1, 2008. The anime series begin to be streamed on January 2, 2010, and the last episode was available on March 27, 2010 for premium users, and on April 3, 2010 for free users.

Each series used different pieces of theme music but all of them used a single opening theme and a single ending theme.

Episode list

Part 1: OVA series 
The Psychogun: Cobra travels to Mars with Professor Utopia Moore to stop the Pirate Guild unlocking secrets of the universe. ''Time Drive'': Armaroid Lady's body starts to disappear so Cobra dives into the past to save her.

Part 2: TV series 
This series features story arcs of one to four episodes each of Cobra saving the world, his friends or himself.

See also 
List of Space Cobra episodes

Notes

References 

Cobra (manga)
Lists of anime episodes